Gregory Kwesi Wüthrich (born 4 December 1994) is a Swiss footballer who plays as a centre-back for 
Bundesliga club Sturm Graz.

Club career 
Wüthrich is a youth exponent from Young Boys. He made his Swiss Super League debut at 2 February 2014 against Thun in 2–1 home win. He made 8 league appearances during the 2013–14 season. After making a total of 15 appearances, 9 of those being in the league, during the 2014–15 season, Wüthrich left Young Boys to join fellow Swiss Super League side Grasshopper on loan on 24 February 2015. He made his club debut on 1 March versus St. Gallen.

Wüthrich signed for A-League club Perth Glory on 18 September 2019.

On 7 August 2020 he signed for Sturm Graz.

International career
Wüthrich was born to a Ghanaian mother and a Swiss father. He is a youth international for Switzerland.

Career statistics

Honours
Young Boys
Swiss Super League: 2017–18

References

1994 births
Living people
Footballers from Bern
Swiss men's footballers
Switzerland youth international footballers
Swiss people of Ghanaian descent
Association football central defenders
BSC Young Boys players
Grasshopper Club Zürich players
Perth Glory FC players
SK Sturm Graz players
Swiss Super League players
A-League Men players
Swiss expatriate footballers
Swiss expatriates in Australia
Expatriate soccer players in Australia